Yevgeniy Nepomnyachshiy (born 12 March 1987 in Petropavl) is a Kazakhstani former professional road bicycle racer, who now works as a directeur sportif for UCI Continental team . Nepomnyachshiy previously spent three years with the  World Tour team.

Major results

2009
 7th Road race, UCI Under-23 Road World Championships
 8th Overall Tour of Bulgaria
2010
 4th Road race, National Road Championships
2011
 5th Time trial, National Road Championships
 10th Coppa Bernocchi
2013
 2nd Overall Tour of Qinghai Lake
1st Stage 7
2017
 6th Overall Tour of Iran (Azerbaijan)
2018
 6th Overall Sri Lanka T-Cup
1st Stage 2

References

External links

1987 births
Living people
People from Petropavl
Kazakhstani male cyclists